The Women's omnium event of the 2016 UCI Track Cycling World Championships was held on 5 and 6 March 2016. Laura Trott of Great Britain won the gold medal.

Results

Scratch race
The scratch race was started at 10:48.

Individual pursuit

Elimination race

500 m time trial
The 500 m time trial was started at 10:16.

Flying lap
The Flying lap was started at 11:28.

Points race
The Points race was started at 14:42.

Final standings
After all events.

References

Women's omnium
UCI Track Cycling World Championships – Women's omnium